Iddesleigh is a hamlet in southern Alberta, Canada within Special Area No. 2.

The community has the name of Walter Northcote, 2nd Earl of Iddesleigh.

Demographics 
Iddesleigh recorded a population of 14 in the 1991 Census of Population conducted by Statistics Canada.

See also 
List of communities in Alberta
List of hamlets in Alberta

References 

Hamlets in Alberta
Special Area No. 2